Jonathan Blades (born 3 February 1975) is a Barbadian cricket umpire. He has stood in matches in the 2016–17 Regional Four Day Competition and the 2016–17 Regional Super50.

References

1975 births
Living people
Barbadian cricket umpires
People from Christ Church, Barbados